Noire Rock is a dark pinnacle rock 1.5 nautical miles (2.8 km) southwest of Mount Dedo on the west coast of Graham Land. Charted and descriptively named (noire means black) by the Belgian Antarctic Expedition under Gerlache in 1898.

Rock formations of Graham Land
Danco Coast